Private Smith of the U.S.A. is a 1942 American short documentary film directed by Slavko Vorkapić. Produced by RKO Radio Pictures, it was nominated for an Academy Award at the 15th Academy Awards for Best Short Subject (Two-Reel). The film features Private William Terry of Pasadena, California, who later starred in Stage Door Canteen (1943).

References

External links
 

1942 films
1940s short documentary films
Black-and-white documentary films
1942 short films
American short documentary films
American black-and-white films
1942 documentary films
RKO Pictures short films
Documentary films about World War II
1940s English-language films
1940s American films